Tinku, a Bolivian Aymara tradition, began as a form of ritualistic combat. In the Quechua language, it means “meeting-encounter". During this ritual, men and women from different communities will meet and begin the festivities by dancing. The women will then form circles and begin chanting while the men proceed to fight each other; eventually the women will join in the fighting as well. Large tinkus are held in Potosí during the first few weeks of May.

The story behind this cultural dance is that long ago, the colonial hacendados set fights between indigenous campesinos for their amusement. Pututu trumpets were used by the Indians in order to call for a Tinku encounter, as well as to assemble the peons when the hacendado required of their presence. Tinku dance costumes are colorful and decorative. Women wear a dress, abarcas, and a hat and men wear an undershirt, pants, jacket, sandals (abarcas), and hard helmet like hats. Even though the people were slaves, they loved to dance, and would often fight, but never really hurting each other.

Because of the rhythmic way the men throw their fists at each other, and because they stand in a crouched stance going in circles around each other, a dance was formed. This dance, the Festive Tinku, simulates the traditional combat, bearing a warlike rhythm. The differences between the Andean tradition and the dance are the costumes, the role of women, and the fact that the dancers do not actually fight each other. The Festive Tinku has become a cultural dance for all of Bolivia, although it originated in Potosí.

Tinku combat

History

The Bolivian tradition began with the indigenous belief in Pachamama, or Mother Nature. The combat is in praise of Pachamama, and any blood shed throughout the fighting is considered a sacrifice, in hopes of a fruitful harvest and fertility. Because of the violent nature of the tradition there have been fatalities, but each death is considered a sacrifice which brings forth life, and a donation to the land that fertilizes it. The brawls are also considered a mean of release of frustration and anger between the separate communities. Tinkus usually last two to three days. During this time, participants will stop every now and then to eat, sleep, or drink.

Methods of combat

During the brawl itself, men will often carry rocks in their hands to have greater force in their punches, or they will just throw them at opponents. Sometimes, especially in the town of Macha in Potosí, where the brawl gets the most violent, men will wrap strips of cloth with shards of glass stuck to them around their fists to cause greater damage. Slingshots and whips are also used, though not as much as hand-to-hand combat. The last day of the fight is considered the most violent and police almost always have to separate the mass of bloody men and women.

Attire

Men attend tinkus wearing traditional monteras, or thick helmet-like hats made of thick leather, resembling helmets from the Conquistadors. These helmets are often painted and decorated with feathers. Their pants are usually simple black or white with traditional embroidering near their feet. Often the men wear wide thick belts tied around their waist and stomach for more protection.

Festive Tinku dance
The Festive Tinku, a much more pleasant experience than a ceremonial tinku, has many differences. It has been accepted as a cultural dance in the whole nation of Bolivia. Tinku music has a loud constant drum beat to give it a native warlike feel, while charangos, guitars, and zampoñas (panpipes) play melodies. The dancers perform with combat like movements, following the heavy beat of the drum.

Costumes

For men, the costumes are more colorful. Their monteras are usually decorated with long colorful feathers. Tinku Suits, or the outfits men wear during Festive Tinku performances, are usually made with bold colors to symbolize power and strength, instead of the neutral colors worn in ceremonial tinkus that help participants blend in. Women wear long embroidered skirts and colorful tops. Their costumes are completed by extravagant hats, painted and decorated with various long and colorful feathers and ribbons. Men and women wear walking sandals so they can move and jump easily.

Dance

The dance is performed in a crouching stance, bending at the waist. Arms are thrown out and there are various kicks, while the performers move in circles following the beat of the drum. Every jump from one foot to the next is followed by a hard stomp and a thrown fist to signify the violence from the ceremonial tinku. Many times the dancers will hold basic and traditional instruments in their hands that they will use as they stomp, just to add more noise for a greater effect.

See also 
 Takanakuy
 Tinkus Wistus

References

Bibliography

Arnold, Denise. At the heart of the woven dance-floor: the wayñu in Qaqachaka. In: Iberoamericana. Lateinamerika-Spanien-Portugal. 16. Jahrgang, Nr. 3/4 (47/48), Vervuert, Frankfurt, 1992.
Arnold, Denise. En el corazón de la plaza tejida. El Wayñu en Qaqachaka. In: Anales de la Reunión annual de etnología. Museo nacional de etnografía y folklore. MUSEF, La Paz, 1992.
Arnold, Denise. Ensayo sobre los origenes del textil andino. En: Anales de la Reunión Annual de Etnología, MUSEF, La Paz, 2001.
Arnold, Denise. López, Ricardo. Jukumarinti sawurinti: El soso-guerrero y la tejedora. Un repertorio literario de lo masculino y lo feminino en los Andes. Universidad Católica Boliviana. Revista número 9 - junio. La Paz, 2001.
Arrueta H., Walter. El Tinku. En: Anales de la Reunión annual de etnología. Museo nacional de etnografía y folklore. MUSEF, La Paz, 1987.
Arzáns de Orsúa y Vela, Bartolomé. Relatos de la Villa Imperial de Potosí. Selección, introducción y cronología de Leonardo García Pabón. Plural. La Paz, 2000.
Baumann, Max Peter. Julajulas – ein bolivianisches Panflötenspiel und seine Musiker. In: Studia instrumentorum musicae popularis. Band 7, Musikhistoriska Museet, Stockholm, 1981.
Baumann, Max Peter. Tinku – zur Fiesta der Begegnung in der Dynamik von Ordnung und Chaos. In: ¡Atención!, Jahrbuch des Österreichischen Lateinamerika-Instituts. Band. 2: Von der realen Magie zum Magischen Realismus. Weltbild und Gesellschaft in Lateinamerika. Hrsg.: Mader, Elke. Dabringer, Maria. Frankfurt, 1999.
Corso Cruz, Cristobal. Calendario folklórico y religioso de Potosí. En: Anales de la Reunión annual de etnología. Museo nacional de etnografía y folklore. MUSEF, La Paz, 1990.
Fernández Juárez, Gerardo. Tinku y Taypi: Dos recursos culinarios pertinentes en las ofrendas aymaras a la Pachamama. In: ANTHROPOLOGICA. 11. Jahrgang, Nr. 11. Pontificia Universidad Católica del Perú. Departamento de Ciencias Sociales. Lima, 1994.
Flores Aguanta, Willer. Calendario de fiestas tradicionales en los ayllus de la Provincia Bustillo. In: Reunión annual de Etnología 1993. Band 2, Serie Anales de la Reunión Annual de Etnología. MUSEF, La Paz, 1994.
Flores Aguanta, Willer. Chullpas en el siglo XXI. (Resúmen histórico del ayllu Chullpa). En: Anales de la Reunión annual de etnología. Museo nacional de etnografía y folklore. MUSEF, La Paz, 2001.
Flores, Willer. López, Jaime. Plicque, Katherine. Lliqllas chayantaka. Textiles en el Norte de Potosí. En: Anales de la Reunión annual de etnología. Museo nacional de etnografía y folklore. MUSEF, La Paz.
Marquez Contreras, Juan Carlos. Vargas Mercado, Oscar Pablo. Tinku: Espacio de encuentro y desencuentro. En: Anales de la Reunión Annual de Etnología, MUSEF, La Paz, 2005.
Mendizábal Nuñez, René et al. El Tinku en Macha : Violencia ritual y violencia represiva. Cuadernos de investigación 5. CEPA, Oruro, 1996.
Ordoñez Oporto, Luis et al. Primer Simposio Nacional Sobre Revalorización Cultural del Tinku. La Paz, Prod. CIMA, um 2003.
Platt, Tristan. Conciencia andina y conciencia proletaria. Qhuyaruna y ayllu en el norte de Potosí. In: HISLA. Revista Latinoamericana de Historia Económica y Social. Band 2. Hrsg.: Bonilla, Heraclio. Pontificia Universidad Católica del Perú. Instituto de Estudios Peruanos, Lima, 1983.
Platt, Tristan. Los Guerreros de Cristo. Cofradías, misa solar, y guerra regenerativa en una doctrina Macha (siglos XVIII-XX). ASUR y Plural editores, La Paz, 1996.
Platt, Tristan. Simon Bolivar, the Sun of Justice and the Amerindian Virgin: Andean Conceptions of the Patria in Nineteenth-Century Potosi. In: Journal of Latin American Studies, Vol. 25, No. 1. (Feb., 1993), pp. 159–185.
Sikkink, Lynn. Water and Exchange: The Ritual of "yaku cambio" as Communal and Competitive Encounter. In: American Ethnologist, Vol. 24, No. 1. (Feb., 1997), pp. 170–189.
Stobart, Henry. Primeros datos sobre la musica campesina del Norte de Potosí. En: Anales de la Reunión annual de etnología. Museo nacional de etnografía y folklore. MUSEF, La Paz, 1987.
Stobart, Henry. The Llama's Flute: Musical Misunderstandings in the Andes. In: Early Music, Vol. 24, No. 3, Early Music from Around the World. (Aug., 1996), pp. 470–482.
Stobart, Henry. Cross, Ian. The Andean Anacrusis? Rhythmic Structure and Perception in Easter Songs of Northern Potosí, Bolivia. In: British Journal of Ethnomusicology, Vol. 9, No. 2. (2000), pp. 63–92.
Stobart, Henry. Flourishing Horns and Enchanted Tubers: Music and Potatoes in Highland Bolivia. In: British Journal of Ethnomusicology, Vol. 3. (1994), pp. 35–48.
Urrea Bustamante, Fernanda. El tinku como fenómeno y sus manifestaciones duales-antagónicas: Representación y continuidad simbólica del dualismo andino. Diplomarbeit. Pontificia Universidad Católica de Valparaíso. Facultad de Filosofía y Educación. Instituto de Música. Valparaíso, 2004.
Valeriano T´ula, Emmo. Tinku. Patrimonio Cultural del altiplano central. En: Anales de la Reunión annual de etnología. Museo nacional de etnografía y folklore. MUSEF, La Paz, 2003
Valeriano Thola, Emmo Emigdio. Música y danza de Julajula en Venta y Media. En: Anales de la Reunión annual de etnología. Museo nacional de etnografía y folklore. MUSEF, La Paz'

External links
La Poética de Tinku y otros articulos sobre Tinku
Group Tinkus Cochabamba (dead link removed)

Religion in Bolivia
Bolivian culture
Potosí
Mock combat
Bolivian dances
Native American dances
Andean music